Wyoming is a town in Kent County, Delaware, United States. It was named after the Wyoming Valley in Pennsylvania. It is part of the Dover, Delaware, Metropolitan Statistical Area. The population was 1,313 at the 2010 census.

History
The community started when the nearby town of Camden would not grant access to the Delaware Railroad (later part of the Pennsylvania Railroad), which bypassed the town and built a railroad station one mile west of the center of town and named the area West Camden. In 1865, minister John J. Pierce moved to West Camden from the Wyoming Valley and laid out plots for new housing. Several individuals from the Wyoming Valley moved to the new community and it was decided to rename the community. The community, "Desiring to sever any shared identity or connection with Camden, residents chose to honor the new citizens by changing the name of the community to Wyoming." A post office was erected in 1866 and the community was incorporated into a town in 1869.

The Lewis Family Tenant Agricultural Complex, Wyoming Historic District, and Wyoming Railroad Station are listed on the National Register of Historic Places.

On February 22, 1975, a vote was held to merge with the bordering town of Camden; the residents of Camden voted 117 to 49 in favor of merging the towns, but the measure failed when Wyoming residents voted against the measure, 113 against to 78 in favor. The Wyoming town council had previously opposed a merger attempt in 1967.

Geography
Wyoming is located at  (39.1181681, –75.5588139).

Demographics

As of the census of 2000, there were 1,141 people, 448 households, and 315 families residing in the town. The racial makeup of the town was 79.49% White, 13.32% African American, 0.09% Native American, 3.86% Asian, 0.53% from other races, and 2.72% from two or more races. Hispanic or Latino of any race were 2.54% of the population.

There were 448 households, out of which 32.8% had children under the age of 18 living with them, 52.5% were married couples living together, 12.7% had a female householder with no husband present, and 29.5% were non-families. 24.1% of all households were made up of individuals, and 7.4% had someone living alone who was 65 years of age or older.  The average household size was 2.55 and the average family size was 2.99.

In the town, the population was spread out, with 25.0% under the age of 18, 7.9% from 18 to 24, 31.4% from 25 to 44, 22.8% from 45 to 64, and 13.0% who were 65 years of age or older.  The median age was 37 years. For every 100 females, there were 99.1 males.  For every 100 females age 18 and over, there were 92.8 males.

The median income for a household in the town was $48,452, and the median income for a family was $54,265. Males had a median income of $35,625 versus $25,741 for females. The per capita income for the town was $21,254.  About 1.8% of families and 3.6% of the population were below the poverty line, including 3.6% of those under age 18 and 3.4% of those age 65 or over.

Climate
The climate in this area is characterized by hot, humid summers and generally mild to cool winters. According to the Köppen Climate Classification system, Wyoming has a humid subtropical climate, abbreviated "Cfa" on climate maps.

Government
Wyoming is governed by a mayor-council system.
Mayor: Steve Bilbrough
Vice Mayor: Doug Denison
Secretary: Tracy Johovic
Treasurer: Kyle Dixon
Council Person: Jeffrey Gravatt

Infrastructure

Transportation

Delaware Route 10 runs east–west along the southeastern edge of Wyoming on Caesar Rodney Avenue, heading west through rural western Kent County to the Maryland border and east along Camden Wyoming Avenue through Camden toward an intersection with U.S. Route 13 and Dover Air Force Base. Delaware Route 15 runs north–south through Wyoming on Southern Boulevard and Railroad Avenue, heading north toward Dover and south toward Woodside. DART First State provides bus service to Wyoming along Route 104, which passes along the eastern edge of town and runs south to the Walmart in Camden and north to the Dover Transit Center in Dover, where it connects to other local bus routes serving the Dover area. The Delmarva Central Railroad's Delmarva Subdivision line passes north–south through Wyoming. Jenkins Airport, a general aviation airport, is located just west of Wyoming.

Utilities
Delmarva Power, a subsidiary of Exelon, provides electricity to Wyoming. Chesapeake Utilities provides natural gas to the town. The Camden-Wyoming Sewer & Water Authority provides sewer and water service to Wyoming and the neighboring town of Camden. Trash and recycling collection in Wyoming is provided under contract by Republic Services.

Education
Wyoming is located in the Caesar Rodney School District. Most students are zoned to W. B. Simpson Elementary School in Wyoming while some are zoned to W. Reilly Brown Elementary School in Dover. Students zoned to Simpson and Brown are zoned to Fred Fifer III Middle School in Camden. Caesar Rodney High School in Camden is the comprehensive high school for the entire district.

Local attractions

The "Wyoming Peach Festival" takes place every August.  It offers pageants, homemade peach ice cream and tours of Fifer Orchards, which is the largest peach and apple producer in the state of Delaware.

The Caesar Rodney Homecoming Parade is held every November to support the Caesar Rodney Riders in their homecoming football game.

References

External links

Official website

Towns in Kent County, Delaware
Towns in Delaware